Nová Louka ( or ) is a mountain meadow in Jizera Mountains (in Czech Jizerské hory) near the city of Bedřichov, district of Jablonec nad Nisou. It is situated in the north of the Czech Republic, approximately 130 km from Prague. There is Blatny brook (in Czech Blatný potok) flowing through the meadow. Nová Louka is an important cross-road of tourist paths in Jizera Mountains. There is sometimes used an alternative, less common name for the meadow which is Šámalova louka after the Czech politician Přemysl Šámal who resided in the house on the meadow. Šámal was the head of the Office of the President of Czechoslovakia during the First Czechoslovak Republic; he took part in resistance movements during World War I and II, and ultimately died in the Nazi prison in Moabit, Berlin.

The meadow is a protected area with peat moor and several protected plants, including hellebore. It was created in 1630 when the trees were cut for the construction of houses in Jičín and Liberec, two important industrial cities in the region. The meadow was first used as a pasture for cows. In 1756, Mr. Riedel built a glass works there, together with a residential timbered house. He was operating the works until 1817. Twenty years later, the works was demolished.

In 1844, the residential house was sold to the Clam-Gallas family, local nobility, which reconstructed the house in a spectacular hunting hut. Today, the hut is called Šámalova chata. On 29 July 1897, the local meteorological station measured 345 mm of rainfall which has been a European record until today.

Tourist attractions in the Czech Republic
Meadows
Geography of the Czech Republic
Grasslands of Europe